Commerce College Ground is a cricket ground in Ahmedabad, India. The ground regularly hosts Ranji matches for Gujarat cricket team from 1945 to 1959. Till date the ground has hosted 15 first-class matches including tour matches against New Zealand cricket team and Australia cricket team since then ground hosted non-first-class matches until 1967.

Tour matches

References

External links 
 Cricketarchive
 Cricinfo

Multi-purpose stadiums in India
Sports venues in Ahmedabad
Cricket grounds in Gujarat
Sports venues completed in 1945
1945 establishments in India
20th-century architecture in India